The 11th Infantry Brigade was a formation of the Royal Hungarian Army that participated in the Axis invasion of Yugoslavia during World War II.

Invasion of Yugoslavia 
The 11th Infantry Brigade, in particular, attacked Baranya and occupied it by 11 April, while the rest of the Third Army occupied Bacska by 14 April.

Organisation

Commanders
11th Infantry Brigade
Brigadier General Kálmán Péchy  (23 Jan 1939 - 1 Feb 1939)
Brigadier General János Dömötor  (1 Feb 1939 - 1 Feb 1942)
Brigadier General Zoltán Álgya-Pap  (1 Feb 1942 - 17 Feb 1942)
11th Light Division
Brigadier General Zoltán Álgya-Pap  (17 Feb 1942 - 15 Oct 1942)
Brigadier General György Sziklay  (15 Oct 1942 - 1 Nov 1942)
Brigadier General Kálmán Csiby  (15 Nov 1942 - 1 June 1943)
Brigadier General Dr. Béla Temesy  (1 June 1943 - 10 Aug 1943)

Notes

References

 

Military units and formations of Hungary in World War II